This is a list of holidays in Grenada.
 January 1: New Year's Day
 February 7: Independence Day, from the United Kingdom in 1974.
 (variable): Good Friday
 (variable) Easter Monday
 May 1: Labour Day
 (variable): Whit Monday
 (variable): Feast of Corpus Christi
 first Monday of August: Emancipation Day, marks the end of slavery in the British Empire in 1834.
 August 11: Carnival
 October 25: Thanksgiving Day, celebrates the United States invasion of Grenada in 1983.
 December 25: Christmas Day
 December 26: Boxing Day

References 

 
Grenada